Zinna may refer to:

 Zinna, village and a former municipality in the district Nordsachsen, in Saxony, Germany
 Zinna (moth), a genus of moths in the family Erebidae
 Riccardo Zinna, Italian actor and musician
 Vincenzo Zinna, Swiss football player
 Forst Zinna rail disaster 
 Villa Zinna, 17th-century country estate located in the Zinnafondo / Zannafondo county in the Province of Ragusa, Sicily
 Zinna Abbey, former Cistercian monastery
 Zinna language, an Adamawa language